Saint Riginos is the patron saint of the island of Skopelos, Greece.  His feast day, February 25, is a local holiday on the island.  Christian tradition states that he was a bishop who was tortured to death in 362 AD.

Part of his remains are kept in a local church, but most of the relics stay in the Archangel Michael Trypiotis Church in Nicosia, Cyprus.

In Skopelos there is a monastery bearing his name, Monastery of Saint Riginos.

References

4th-century Christian saints
Saints from Roman Greece